Pancheria multijuga is a species of shrub in the family Cunoniaceae. It is endemic to New Caledonia, where it is rare and found only on a few mountains.

References

multijuga
Endemic flora of New Caledonia
Conservation dependent plants
Near threatened biota of Oceania
Taxonomy articles created by Polbot